Late Night Tales: Turin Brakes is a DJ mix album, mixed by Turin Brakes. It is the 11th in Late Night Tales' Late Night Tales / Another Late Night series. Turin Brakes were approached to release a compilation in 2003. Since the release Turin Brakes have done several DJ sets in the London area. The album features an exclusive cover of the Rolling Stones' "Moonlight Mile."

Track listing 
 "Last Night I Dreamt Of Mississippi" - Nicolai Dunger
 "Midnight Cowboy" - John Barry
 "Send In The Clouds" - Silver Jews
 "Lagos Soundsystem" (featuring Henri Gaobi) - Les Barons
 "A Walk In The Night" - Grant Green
 "Blues Music" - G. Love & Special Sauce
 "Dreamy Eyed Girl" - John Hammond
 "Breaking Your Fall" - Chris Whitley
 "Speed Trials" - Dave Palmer
 "Magnolia" - J. J. Cale
 "I Believe In You" - Talk Talk
 "Short Tales Of The Black Forest" (featuring John McLaughlin) - Al Di Meola
 "Cold Blooded Old Times" - Smog
 "One And Only" - Gillian Welch
 "A Pearl For Iona" - Jessica Lauren
 "Moonlight Mile" - Turin Brakes
 "The White City Part 4" - read by Brian Blessed

Turin Brakes
2004 compilation albums